"Vendetta for a Dead Man" is the twenty-fourth episode of the 1969 ITC British television series Randall and Hopkirk (Deceased) starring Mike Pratt, Kenneth Cope and Annette Andre. The episode was first broadcast on 27 February 1970 on  ITV. It was directed by Cyril Frankel.

Synopsis

A convicted murderer named Eric Jansen escapes from the psychiatric ward of his prison almost exactly one year after he was locked up by Marty Hopkirk. Seeking his revenge he finds that Marty has already died but learns that his widow Jeannie Hopkirk is very much alive and has inherited everything he owned. He hunts Jeannie down who at the time was engrossed in a new love interest of her own eventually taking her to some rocky cliffs. There he intended to cast her into the sea exactly one year after he was caught in the same spot. But thanks to Marty, Jeff is there in the nick of time and saves Jeannie whilst Jansen loses his balance and falls in the sea.

Cast
Mike Pratt as Jeff Randall
Kenneth Cope as Marty Hopkirk
Annette Andre as Jeannie Hopkirk
Ann Castle ....  Mrs. Cavallo-Smith
Henry Davies ....  Police Sergeant in Car
William Dysart ....  Police Inspector
Barrie Ingham ....  Emil Cavallo-Smith
Richard Owens ....  Police Sergeant Bodyguard
Ron Pember ....  Fairground Concessionaire
Colin Rix ....  Police Driver
George Sewell ....  Eric Jansen
Sue Vaughan ....  Blonde Girl in Car
Timothy West ....  Sam Grimes

External links
https://web.archive.org/web/20070206224216/http://www.anorakzone.com/randall/old/index.html

Randall and Hopkirk (Deceased) episodes
1970 British television episodes